Merian is a patrician family of Basel, Switzerland. It consists of two branches (an 'elder Basel line' and a 'younger' one) who were citizens of Basel from 1498 and from 1549/1553. The family were represented in the Grand Council of Basel-Stadt in 1532 and grew to become distinguished aldermen. Its notable members include the 18th century politician  and the 19th century banker Christoph Merian, who founded the renowned Basel charity Christoph Merian Stiftung.

The younger Basel line includes a Frankfurt sub-branch founded by the engraver Matthäus Merian the Elder (1593-1650), whose descendants became artists during the Baroque period and ran what became one of Europe's largest publishers in the 17th century. Matthäus Merian's daughter was the naturalist and artist Maria Sibylla Merian.

Origin and distribution
The family name is not limited to Basel, and is also found (in variants like Meria, Merian, Meriam and von Merian) in Alsace, Lorraine, Provence, Lower Austria, and Mecklenburg. These families are probably not directly related to the Merians of Basel, but a common root is likely in the former Prince-Bishopric of Basel in the earliest forms of the name Merillate, Merylat, Miregla, Mureglat or Latinized Mariatte. The name probably derives from the office of Meier (meaning steward or estate manager); unlikely, however, is a speculated relationship to the community of Meria in Corsica or to an alleged Merian Abbey in the Archdiocese of Strasbourg, and the same is unlikely with reference to the Marioni nobility from Milan or to de Muriaux in the Bishopric of Basel.

The oldest written reference to the family in the bishopric dates from the year 1385 with the mention of a Jehannin dit Mariatte de Buratte ("'Johann, called Mariatte, citizens, bears witness'"), who resided in a dairy at Bure, Switzerland. This dairy farm had belonged since 1283 to the bishops of Basel, before the dukes of Alsace and the Counts of Mömpelgard/Montbéliard and von Pfirt/Ferrette.

Naturalisation in Basel
The ancestor of the Merians of Basel is Theobald Merian (c.1415 – c.1505), a Basel episcopal bailiff or steward in Lüttelsdorf (now Courroux) in the Swiss canton of Jura. From him are descended the two Basel branches of the family. The elder line stems from his son Theobald Merian (1465 – 1544), who went in 1480 as a seaman of Lüttelsdorf to Basel and later operated a sawmill on the right bank of the Rhine in Kleinbasel. The younger line from Johann Petrus Merian (c.1468/1478 – after 1519) is thought to be related, as he was an episcopal steward who also came from Lüttelsdorf to Basel, but whether Theobald (the son) and Johann Petrus were brothers and both therefore sons of Theobald (the father) as tradition claims, is unproven.

Frankfurt sub-branch
In 1624 the Swiss-born engraver Matthäus Merian (a descendant of the younger line) took over the Frankfurt publishing house of his father-in-law Johann Theodor de Bry, and in 1626 he acquired Frankfurt citizenship. After his death in 1650 two of his sons, Matthäus Merian the Younger and Caspar, built up the publishing house under the name Matthäus Merian Seel. In 1687 the publishing house was inherited by a third generation family member, Johann Matthäus Merian (1659-1716), the second son of Matthäus the Younger. Johann's elder brother Carl Gustav Merian was later elevated to the nobility by the Elector of Mainz and appointed to the Privy Council. After Johann's death in 1716 the company was led by his niece Charlotte Maria Merian (1691-1729) until its dissolution in 1727. The Frankfurt family line died with the painter Carl Matthäus Merian (1705-1770), a great-grandson of Matthäus Merian the Elder. The family name is remembered today in Frankfurt's Merianstrasse and Merianplatz, and in Merian School in Nordend.

Significant family members

Elder Basel line
Hans Bernhard (Jean-Bernard) Merian (1723–1807) - perpetual secretary of the Academy of Sciences at Berlin
Christoph Merian (Senior) (1769-1849) - merchant and banker, seven-times-great-grandson of Theobald Merian (Junior).
 (1773–1848) - merchant and philanthropist, brother of Christoph (Senior).
Peter Merian (1795–1883) - professor of geology, brother of Johann Rudolf, second cousin of Christophe (Senior).
 (1797–1871) - mathematician and politician, brother of Peter.
Christoph Merian (1800–1858) - banker, businessman and agriculturalist, son of Christophe (Senior).

Younger Basel line (including Frankfurt sub-branch)
Matthäus Merian the Elder (1593–1650) - engraver and publisher, great-grandson of Johann Petrus Merian.
 (1621–1687) - painter, engraver, publisher and bookseller.
 (1627–1686) - landscape artist, son of Matthäus the Elder
Anna Maria Sibylla Merian (1647–1717) - naturalist and illustrator, dtr. of Matthäus the Elder
Johann Matthäus von Merian (1659–1716) - pastel painter, son of Matthäus the Younger
Johanna Helena Herolt (1668-1723) - painter, dtr. of Maria Sibylla Merian
Dorothea Maria Graff (1678–1745) - dtr. of Maria Sibylla Merian, married painter Georg Gsell
Andreas Merian-Iselin (1742–1811) - Basel politician and Swiss Landammann (chief magistrate).
Andreas, baron von Merian (1772–1828) - Son of Andreas Merian-Iselin, diplomat in France and Russia
Lukas Amadeus Merian (1808–1889) - Architect in Basel

Merian family tree (younger Basel line)
Note: For the sake of simplicity, not all marriages, siblings and offspring have been included.

References

Further reading
 Joseph Eduard Wessely: Merian. In: Allgemeine Deutsche Biographie (ADB). Band 21, Duncker & Humblot, Leipzig 1885, pp. 422–427.
 J. P. Zwicky von Gauen (ed.): Schweizerisches Geschlechterbuch / Almanach Généalogique Suisse. Zürich 1955.
 Wolfgang Klötzer (Hrg.), Frankfurter Biographie. Zweiter Band M-Z. Verlag Waldemar Kramer, Frankfurt am Main 1996,

External links

 
Swiss noble families
History of Basel
Patriciate of Basel